Bobbie was the name of a British regimental mascot dog, a mongrel from Reading, who accompanied his regiment to Afghanistan and became involved in the disaster of Maiwand.  He survived and upon his return to England was presented to Queen Victoria, along with several of his human colleagues.

Life
Bobbie belonged to Lance-Sergeant Peter Kelly of the 66th Regiment of Foot (the Berkshire Regiment).  He was initially stationed at Brock Barracks, and went overseas with the regiment in the late 1870s.

In 1880 the regiment was stationed at the fort in Kandahar, Afghanistan, which had been occupied by the British since January 1879, just after the start of the Second Anglo-Afghan War.

On 3 July 1880, a column of some 2,700 troops under Brigadier George Burrows set out from Kandahar to assist friendly tribesmen in putting down a rebellion by Ayub Khan. Bobbie accompanied the troops. For ten days, Burrows searched for the rebel force. Meanwhile, the friendly tribesmen turned out not to be so friendly, leaving Burrows' force to face an ever-increasing rebel army in countryside where every man's hand was ready to turn against them.

Eventually, the British force was surrounded and attacked by a much larger Afghan force. Along with a line of Indian regiments and cavalry, the 66th Foot made a determined stand while the guns were evacuated, Bobbie barking furiously at the attackers.  The British were overrun, over half of the 66th Regiment being wiped out, while the survivors had no option, but to retreat to Kandahar.  In the confusion, Bobbie got lost, but the following day, survivors making their way back to the fort spotted him trying to catch up, though he was wounded.  He was re-united with his owner, who was also on the wounded list.

Upon arrival back in England, Bobbie was presented to Queen Victoria, along with several soldiers of the regiment, who received Distinguished Conduct Medals.  Bobbie was awarded the Afghanistan Medal.

A year later, Bobbie was accidentally run over and killed by a hansom cab in Gosport, Hampshire. He was stuffed and can be seen today at The Rifles Berkshire and Wiltshire Museum in Salisbury.  He was loaned to Reading Museum for a World War One exhibition.

Memorials
As well as the display in the Regimental Museum at Salisbury, Bobbie is featured on a commemorative coin given to those who attended the 2004 opening of the Animals in War Memorial in Hyde Park in London.

References

External links
 Dogs in the Second Anglo-Afghan War
  Picture of Bobbie
  Two paintings of Bobbie in the thick of the fight

Military history of Berkshire
Individual dogs